The Sacramento Northern Railway (reporting mark SN) was a  electric interurban railway that connected Chico in northern California with Oakland via the California capital, Sacramento. In its operation it ran directly on the streets of Oakland, Sacramento, Yuba City, Chico, and Woodland and ran interurban passenger service until 1941 and freight service into the 1960s.

History

Summary

The Sacramento Northern (SN) was an electrified interurban railroad in California that extended  from Oakland north to Chico. A classic interurban in that it ran down the center of city streets in a number of towns, the SN was also a heavy duty electric railroad that moved considerable freight tonnage. There were three branches, one to Woodland, one to Colusa, and one to Oroville. The SN had been two separate interurban companies connecting at Sacramento until 1925. The Oakland, Antioch, and Eastern Railway was a catenary-wire powered line that ran from Oakland through a tunnel in the Oakland hills to Moraga, Walnut Creek, Concord, Pittsburg, to Sacramento. It was renamed the San Francisco-Sacramento Railroad briefly. The Northern Electric Railway was a third-rail powered line that ran from Sacramento north through Marysville-Yuba City to Chico. The SN crossed the Sacramento River on the Red Gate Bridge. It was renamed the Sacramento Northern Railroad in 1914. In 1928, the two lines combined to become the Sacramento Northern Railway under control of the Western Pacific Railroad which operated it as a separate entity. An extensive multiple-car passenger service operated from Oakland to Chico until 1941 including providing dining car service on some trains. Passenger traffic was heaviest from Sacramento to Oakland. Freight operation using electric locomotives continued into the 1960s. The SN was a typical interurban in that its trains, including freight, ran on downtown city streets in Oakland, Sacramento, Yuba City, and Woodland. This involved multiple car trains making sharp turns at street corners and obeying traffic signals. Once in open country, SN's passenger trains ran at fairly fast speeds. With its shorter route and lower fares, the SN provided strong competition to the Southern Pacific and Western Pacific railroads for passenger business and freight business between those two cities. North of Sacramento, both passenger and freight business was less due to the small town agricultural nature of the region and due to competition from the paralleling Southern Pacific Railroad.

Detailed history

The original,  route connected Chico with Sacramento. The original name of this line was the Chico Electric Railway (CERY), in operation beginning in 1905. CERY was sold in 1905, after a few months of operation, to the newly-formed Northern Electric Railway (NER). The NER went into bankruptcy in 1914, and was reorganized into a new corporation named the Sacramento Northern Railroad (SNRR).

The Western Pacific Railroad (WP) purchased the SNRR in 1922 as a subsidiary and kept the original name. In 1925 the WP created a "new" Sacramento Northern Railway (SNRy), in order to group the growing collection of WP interurban railroad holdings.

The Sacramento Northern Railway was created from two interurban railroads:
Northern Electric Railway — the third-rail-powered "North End" from Sacramento north through the agricultural Sacramento Valley to Marysville-Yuba City and Chico from late 1905 to 1918. It became the Northern Division of the SNRy.
San Francisco-Sacramento Railroad — the trolley-wire-powered "South End" operated from Sacramento south through farmland, marshes, over a bay by its own ferry, to Pittsburg-Concord, through the Contra Costa County hills and tunnel to Oakland and the Key System ferry pier. In 1928 the San Francisco-Sacramento Railroad (formerly the Oakland, Antioch and Eastern Railway, and originally the Oakland and Antioch Railway) became the Southern Division of the SNRy.

By retaining the Sacramento Northern Railway as a subsidiary rather than just absorbing it into the Western Pacific Railroad, the WP earned more income by interchanging freight with a separate Sacramento Northern Railroad due to extra fees earned from shipper-customers by interchanging freight from one railroad (itself) to another (the Sacramento Northern). Western Pacific also owned regional sister electric railroads, the Tidewater Southern Railway (TS) (Stockton to Modesto) and the Central California Traction Company (CCT) (Stockton to downtown Sacramento). The TS and the CCT used the same downtown Sacramento terminal and ran directly on Sacramento streets.

The two divisions used different voltages as well as different methods of current collection, thus only some powered equipment could traverse the entire Chico to Oakland route. When in Oakland, SN used Key System electric power. Some equipment carried a third rail shoe, a trolley pole, and a pantograph. The differing electrical systems, third rail for the North End and trolley wire for the South End, were retained. Some passenger interurban cars and freight locomotives were designed to operate on both "Ends" but most could not and had to remain on their home divisions.

Sacramento Northern also continued to operate streetcar services in many of its host cities. A line in Sacramento to Swanston ran between 1914 and 1932, largely subsidized by a local developer.

At the southern end the SNRy shared track, electric propulsion power, and facilities of the East Bay's expansive Key System commuter lines. At first this used the Key System's ferry terminal at the Oakland Mole in West Oakland. Then beginning in 1939 it used the tracked lower deck of the San Francisco–Oakland Bay Bridge into the Transbay Terminal in San Francisco. After 1958, the Key System ceased operating, and the tracks were removed from streets and the Bay Bridge.

Scheduled service
At , the railroad's Comet and Meteor services between San Francisco and Chico were the longest interurban lines in North America. It was built and operated to first-class railroad standards, such as providing dining and parlor car service. Passenger service to Oroville ended in 1938. In June 1939 SN, ran three weekday trains from Chico to San Francisco, one from Sacramento to SF, and three from Concord to SF. The fastest train took 5 hr 43 min from Chico to San Francisco, and 2 hr 48 min Sacramento to SF. Passenger service west from Sacramento (to Chico) ended in August 1940. In January 1941, SN operated two weekday trains from Pittsburg to San Francisco and two Concord trains to SF. Interurban passenger service totally ended in 1941, but local Chico service lasted until 1947. Afterwards, SN transitioned to become a shortline freight-hauling railroad.

Financial issues
As with most interurban railroads in the US, the SN's return on initial investment was lower and its annual operating costs were higher than had been projected at conception. Interurbans, like most railroads, were very labor-intensive, particularly with the labor costs of maintaining motorized rolling stock and repairing electrical systems. Passenger business was less than initially projected and became increasingly unprofitable, even after SN reached downtown San Francisco via the new San Francisco–Oakland Bay Bridge in 1939. Its freight business and its relationship with the adjacent Western Pacific Railroad was the lifeblood of the railroad, keeping it in profit long after passenger service had ceased. Although it had a somewhat shorter route from Oakland to Pittsburg/Antioch in competing with the Santa Fe and Southern Pacific steam railroads, its route through the Oakland hills was steep (4%) and curvy by railroad standards plus it had on-street operation in Oakland. Freight trains usually had just a few cars on those grades with locomotives ("juice jacks") at both ends of the train. From Sacramento north to Chico, the SN competed with the Southern Pacific Railroad and, up to 1922, with the Western Pacific from Marysville south. It traversed a low density population rural farm country from Chico which contained only Marysville-Yuba City as major towns before it reaching Sacramento. Thus, passenger business north of Sacramento was light and could not be expected to increase. The SN had branches to Vacaville and Dixon, Woodland, Marysville and Colusa, and Oroville.

Business decline
The railway suffered from statewide business decline due to the Great Depression plus the increasing automobile use on improved roads. Passenger service ended in 1941, while streetcar service in Chico continued until 1947. Other travails included the 1951 Lisbon Trestle Collapse, in which crewmen were hurt and a long causeway trestle needed costly rebuilding; the withdrawal of the Sacramento Northern's aging train ferry, "Ramon"; and the abandonment of service on the Dixon Branch. Freight service continued and was heavy during World War II.

Reducing electrification
The SN received its first diesel locomotives in 1941 and this began its process of de-electrification. All electric operation ceased in 1965 at Yuba City after which the railway operated as a dieselized freight subsidiary of the Western Pacific. Trackage was abandoned over the years, especially that which duplicated routes on other railroads. The SN name ceased to exist with the WP's acquisition by the Union Pacific in 1983.

Present day segment

The SN line south of Sacramento connecting the present day ghost towns of Montezuma, Dozier, and Cannon in Solano County is now owned and operated and electrified by the Western Railway Museum as a heritage railway. Much of the SN's former equipment is part of the museum's permanent collection.

Timeline

Route

Oakland to Sacramento 

In June of 1911, SN's predecessor, the Oakland and Antioch, purchased a parcel of land from the Realty Syndicate (associated with the Key System) for its planned terminal yard at 40th Street and Shafter Avenue in Oakland.  Construction of the facility began immediately in conjunction with the laying of tracks from the site northward along Shafter Avenue toward the hills.

Although the compact yard at 40th and Shafter was the end of its right-of-way, SN trains continued west along 40th St. on the tracks of the Key System and on to the Key System's "mole". In later years, the trains ran over the San Francisco–Oakland Bay Bridge which was built near the site of the Key mole, to San Francisco's downtown Transbay Terminal, connecting by way of the Key's tracks on Yerba Buena Avenue and 40th Street. This service ended with the railroad's passenger service in 1941, but freight interchange with the Key System continued until that system's demise.

The main line ran on single track north up the center of Shafter Avenue in a residential area, passing Emerson Elementary School at 49th Street. At the end of Shafter, the track crossed College Avenue next to Claremont Junior High School and started a long curving 4% grade into the Oakland hills in the Rockridge district of Oakland. It then crossed the Temescal Canyon inlet of Lake Temescal via a bridge.  During the preparations for the Broadway (Caldecott) Tunnel project, this inlet was filled in and the Sacramento Northern tracks re-routed along the top of a new high embankment above the lake, buttressed by a massive retaining wall that still exists today.

From Lake Temescal, the tracks ran southeast through the Montclair district of Oakland. It crossed into Montclair over a trestle at Moraga Avenue and Thornhill Drive, then ran along a high berm between Montclair Recreation Center and Montclair Elementary School, before crossing Mountain Blvd and Snake Road via trestle. High above the northwest side of Shepherd Canyon, the line headed east, then made a sharp turn northeast as it passed through a major cut in the hill. It then climbed up Shepherd Canyon to a station called "Havens" at Paso Robles Dr., named for real estate developer Frank C. Havens, one-time partner of the Key System's "Borax" Smith who was trying to encourage sales in Shepherd Canyon. 

At Havens, below Saroni Drive, the line entered a short ravine leading to the entrance of a one mile long single-track tunnel under the Oakland Hills. The tunnel itself is still intact but is sealed at both ends. In 1994, home developers filled in the approach ravine and tunnel mouth and constructed residential homes on this fill and on top of the tunnel. The upper foot of the top of the tunnel portal could be observed in the back yard of one of the new homes. A home further northeast behind the first was constructed on top of the unlined tunnel, and by altering drainage in the area caused the tunnel below the home to slowly subside. The home shifted and dropped and had to be removed.

The SN track exited the tunnel into Contra Costa County at Pinehurst Road near Huckleberry Botanic Regional Preserve, and immediately curved over a bridge over Pinehurst Road to run southeastward through Redwood Canyon. The railroad designated a station just outside the tunnel portal as "Eastport." The tunnel portal is no longer visible, largely as a result of a landslide which occurred during the El Niño rains of the early 1980s. 

The right of way ran along an extant fire trail near the spot where Pinehurst Road makes a sharp u-turn. This fire trail was previously known as Winding Way on some maps, and was originally an old 19th century logging road built by Hiram Thorn, for bringing redwood logs out of the Moraga Redwoods and to his mill, and then over the mountain into Oakland. Even earlier, the route up the canyon to what is now Huckleberry preserve was a cattle trail for the Spanish and Mexican ranchers, en route to a landing at the mouth of Temescal Creek on San Francisco Bay.

At the sharp curve at Eastport, the tracks immediately crossed over Pinehurst road on a bridge. The right-of-way then headed down Redwood Canyon on a ledge (still apparent today) just above Pinehurst Road, progressing southeast past the small community of Canyon. The line then turned north to Moraga, past St Mary's, and thence northeasterly through Lafayette, Saranap, and the valley past Walnut Creek and to Concord and Pittsburg. Some of the right of way through Contra Costa County is now used by the BART system to Concord. 

At Pittsburg, the tracks ran parallel, adjacent, and south of the Santa Fe and the Southern Pacific main lines, then dropped down, turned north sharply and went under the SF and SP through an underpass to almost immediately reach the SN ferry landing on Suisun Bay. (This track layout and underpass are still shown on a 2009 Google website map of Pittsburg.) The Pittsburg side ferry landing and depot was called "Mallard" by the SN. There a ferry boat (the Ramon) carried an entire passenger train across to a north side landing near Suisun called "Chipps" on Chipps Island. 

From here the line proceeded north across an extensive marshland (including Chipps Island and Van Sickle Island) on a long trestle. After the trestle, the tracks continued north through farmland past Montezuma, Rio Vista Junction, and Creed, where there was a branch west to Vacaville and Travis Air Force Base.  In 1913 a spur was built that connected Rio Vista Junction to the town of Dixon to the north, but it was unprofitable and was abandoned after a year or two.

Past Creed, the line continued to Dozier and Yolano before crossing the four mile long Lisbon trestle into West Sacramento.  This trestle collapsed in July 1951 as a steeple cab powered freight train of steel plate for Pittsburg was crossing it.  At West Sacramento, just west of the Tower Bridge, the line to Woodland left the southbound main line and headed west.

Past West Sacramento, the line entered the city of Sacramento by way of the "M" Street Bridge (1911), and later by way of its replacement (1935), the Tower Bridge, which is still in use.  The SN progressed through downtown streets onto I Street to reach the substantial columned two-story brick and stone "Union Terminal" on I Street between 11th and 12th. Union Terminal, also used by Central California Traction trains to Stockton in the early years, is now gone after use in the 1950s-1960s as a grocery store. Downtown Sacramento streets, particularly east and south of the Tower Bridge, carried many SN and Central California Traction tracks.

Line section abandonments
Freight service from Oakland to Lafayette ceased on March 1, 1957. Overhead wire and tracks were removed and the Shepherd Canyon tunnel sealed. The former roadbed from St Mary's College through Lafayette was converted to the popular Lafayette-Moraga trail. The following year, freight service only extended from Walnut Creek to Sacramento. 

The Ferry "Ramon" was removed from service in 1954, so SN, through parent Western Pacific, had to obtain trackage rights on the Santa Fe from Stockton to Pittsburg where SN trains could reach SN tracks and freight shippers in Pittsburg and Concord. When the Union Pacific absorbed Western Pacific/SN it obtained further trackage rights on the Santa Fe which extended to Port Chicago where SN had a small yard. Thus, Pittsburg trackage was removed in the early 1990s. 

As of 2009,  Google and MapQuest maps acquired by web searching "Rio Vista CA" shows original SN track and sidings (most now abandoned) at Pittsburg and north of Suisun Bay including the northward turn under the SF & SP to the Suisun Bay shore. The track Rio Vista-Creed is still shown as SN. At Rio Vista Junction is the present Western Railway Museum and active electrified track.

Sacramento to Chico 

From the Sacramento depot at present day Terminal Way, the SN's "North End" ran to a Northern Electric-built truss bridge crossing the American River and then on to Rio Linda, to E. Nicolaus, then to Marysville where it crossed the Feather River into adjacent Yuba City, split off the branch to Colusa, then went on to Live Oak, split off the branch to Oroville, then to Gridley and to Chico where it terminated. In Chico there were yards and primary shops. From a junction just northwest of Yuba City, another branchline ran west to Meridian and Colusa. It crossed the Sacramento River at Meridian on a narrow combined rail and vehicle bridge. From Yuba City to Meridian the track ran alongside and north of the Colusa Highway, California State Route 20. In 1992 this track and unusual Meridian bridge were still in use and provided the SN with a Southern Pacific-Union Pacific interchange at Colusa. As of 2009, Google Maps still showed the former SN trackage alongside SR 20.

Woodland Branch 
The electrified Woodland branch line left the Oakland bound main line at West Sacramento and ran  straight west toward Woodland (known as the Yolo Shortline RR until 2003 and now known as the Sierra Northern Railway). The track proceeds across a very long elevated wood viaduct-bridge over the wide Yolo flood plain to enter Woodland and go down Main Street to the Woodland Opera House where the interurban cars turned around. Today SERA terminates shortly before East Street several blocks east of the Opera House. The Woodland terminal was a unique Mission-style structure and was recently reconstructed. The Sacramento bound interurban cars exited the terminal onto Main Street through a unique archway in the station wall.

In Sacramento

The SN entered Sacramento from the north crossing the American River on a through truss bridge. It then proceeded on private right of way berween 18th and 19th streets to D street where it turned west in the middle of D to 15th Street then south on 15th to I street where it turned west on I to the city's intrerurban Union Terminal and interurban car storage yard bounded by H, I, 11th and 12th streets. Trains turned into the terminal leaving the street. It then proceeded west on I to 8th, then turned south to M Street, then west on M over the Sacramento River to West Sacramento. From there it turned south on a direct line to Rio Vista and the delta river crossing on the SN ferry at Chipps.

Terminals and Stations
Sacramento's first interurban terminal (for the Northern Electric Railway's line from Chico and Yuba City) was at Eighth and J Streets. Sacramento's two other interurban lines, the San Francisco-Sacramento and the Central California Traction (to Stockton) had separate terminals. Pressure from Sacramento to stop loading multiple-car interurban trains on city streets led to construction of a terminal for all three in 1925. This produced the impressive two-story columned brick Union Station along I Street between 11th and 12th Streets, near the current Sacramento RT Light Rail 12th & I station. Trains left I street to circle behind the terminal to one of four tracks for passenger loading. The station burned internally 1972 and was removed around 2000.

The SN mission style terminal at 30 mile west Woodland was unusual in that the interurban cars from Sacramento went through an arch in the station's wall to reach a rail yard in the rear. This terminal was close to the Woodland Opera House, unique for such a small town.

Technical information

Electrification 

Because of interconnection with the Key System, SN cars had to operate under a number of different electrical standards. The North End was electrified at 600 volts DC, the nationwide standard trolley and interurban voltage at the time of construction. Trolley wire and trolley poles were used only in urban areas. In the open country, the line used a solid, uncovered top-contact third rail. Cars built originally for the North End could not operate south of Sacramento. The South End (former OA&E, Oakland, Antioch, and Eastern) was electrified largely at 1,200 volts DC until 1936, after which it operated at 1,500 volts, with areas of 600 volts in Oakland and Sacramento.

The interurban cars had to use a pantograph rather than the trolley pole on Key System rails (electrified at 600 volts) and over the Bay Bridge (electrified at 1,200 volts for the Southern Pacific); the Key System used a covered top-contact third rail over the bridge. Because of the Key System's third rail, cars that could traverse the whole system had to have their third rail shoes removed, since the top-contact shoes would have fouled the Key System rail's cover. They were normally added or removed in Sacramento. Such all-line capable cars were switchable between 600 V and 1,200 V operation; they could also operate at half power at the 1,200 V setting on 600 V overhead.

The SN's south end high-quality electrification used catenary rather than a single trolley wire, leading to the eventual exclusive use of pantographs rather than trolley poles south of Sacramento. Catenary allows the vertical supporting poles to be spaced farther apart than if a single suspended trolley wire is used, plus it is better for pantograph operation at speed due to stability (The South Shore line uses pantographs with a single trolley wire in Michigan City streets but has catenary for high speed operation elsewhere).

Cars and trains 
Sacramento Northern offered dining service aboard parlor-observation cars Bidwell, Sacramento, Moraga and Alabama.  The Alabama had been built in 1905 as the private car of Pacific Electric Railway owner Henry E. Huntington and was purchased by the SN. This elegant car operated on the Sacramento Northern from 1921 until destroyed in 1931 by a fire caused by a short circuit in its coffeemaker. Sacramento Northern name trains operating between Oakland, Sacramento and Chico included the Comet, Meteor, Sacramento Valley Limited and Steamer Special

Suisun Bay crossing and ferry

Planned bridge 

The bay saw heavy shipping traffic and thus a high-level drawbridge with long approaches was required. Construction began in 1912; the estimated price tag was $1.5 million and construction time was estimated as two and a half years. This would have delayed the opening of the railway, and so an alternative plan of a ferry service was implemented as a temporary measure. Construction of the bridge stopped in May 1913 after construction of the pier on the Contra Costa County side, because of a shortage of funds due to uncertainties brought on by World War I. The railway, not meeting revenue expectations, never did restart construction, and the "temporary" ferry service became permanent.

Car ferry service 
The railway was one of only two interurbans to operate a car ferry, and was the longer and more ambitious of the two. The first ferry constructed, the  Bridgit (a pun on "Bridge It") was constructed of wood in San Francisco and launched in July 1913. It was destroyed by fire on May 17, 1914.

After unsuccessful experiments with an unpowered barge, the railroad rented car floats from other railroads in the area and commissioned a new, steel ferry from the Lanteri Shipyard in nearby Pittsburg. The Ramon was constructed entirely from flat steel plate to save time, and had no curved surfaces on its hull. It was double ended with a central, raised bridge in the typical carfloat style. Power was by a  distillate engine, one of the largest constructed, which was insufficient to counteract high winds and currents in the bay.

Three tracks were installed on the deck, all long enough to carry three passenger cars or five freight cars. All three could not be used at the same time; the central track overlapped the other two, and either the single central track or the two outside tracks could be used, depending on load. All tracks were equipped with powered trolley wire.

The Ramon was retired in 1954 after a Coast Guard inspection determined that the hull plating was no longer in a safe condition, and it was scrapped locally.

Bridges and viaducts 

California State Route 20 crossed the Sacramento River at Meridian on a bridge also carrying the Sacramento Northern's line to Colusa. The tracks were in the center of the bridge and the two highway lanes were on the sides. It was replaced in 1977.

The SN had two very long wood piling viaducts that crossed the Yolo flood plain, the Lisbon trestle to Rio Vista and the Yolo causeway to Woodland.

See also 

 List of California street railroads
 Northern Electric Railway—Marysville and Colusa Branch
 Rail trail

References

Bibliography and further reading

 
 
 
 
 
 
 
 
 
 
 
 
 
 
 
  These are probably the most complete and detailed reference materials available regarding the Sacramento Northern Railroad. Author and publisher Swett, now deceased, spent a lifetime producing publications about interurban railways nationwide. Some are available in the Library of Congress.

External links 

  Sacramento Northern Online.com: extensive Sacramento Northern coverage with history and photographs.
 Abandonedrails.com:  Interactive map of the Sacramento Northern Railway
 Niagararails.com: Map of the Sacramento Northern lines.
  Oberail.org:  Sacramento Northern Railway history and photographs
 Yahoo Group: Sacramento Northern book
  Bayarearailfan.org: newspaper article on SNRR (1994)
  Blu-streak.com: Oakland Antioch and Eastern Railroad−OA&E, maps and photos
 Bay Area Rails.org: Sacramento Northern RR photos
  Western Railway Museum.org: Operating trolley museum at Rio Vista Junction, Solano County — history and photos of SNRR.

 
1918 establishments in California